Biers Run is a stream in the U.S. state of Ohio. It is a tributary of Paint Creek.

A small community of the same name once stood near the banks of Biers Run. The location of Bier post office is unknown to the GNIS.

See also
List of rivers of Ohio

References

Rivers of Ross County, Ohio
Rivers of Ohio